Be the Creature is a TV series created by the Kratt Brothers (Chris and Martin). A wildlife series designed to immerse both the brothers and the viewers in the world of animals, unlike the brothers' previous works, Kratts' Creatures and Zoboomafoo, Be the Creature is oriented towards teens and adults. The brothers place themselves in the thick of the animal world, sometimes in high-intensity or dangerous situations. The series also features some graphic footage in an effort to portray life in the wild truthfully.

A second season entitled, Be the Creature 2, began in 2005. The show is airing on National Geographic Wild.
A third season entitled, " Be The Creature 3", began in 2007.

List of episodes

Season 1
 Brown Bear
 African Wild Dog
 African Lion
 Japanese Macaque
 Lemur
 Manatee
 Coastal Creature
 Chimpanzee
 Banded Mongoose
 Mexican Free- Tailed Bat
 Great White Shark
 Gelada Baboon
 Eastern Gray Kangaroo

Season 2
 Cheetah
 Orangutan
 Komodo Dragon
 Meerkat
 Kill Zone
 The Pantanal
 Galapagos
 Spotted Hyena
 Battling Bighorn
 Staying Alive's
 Weapons For Survival
 Leopard
 Ethiopian Wolf
 Leopard
 Expedition Leopard
 Expedition Japanese Macaque

Season 3
 Giant Panda

External links
Be the Creature Official Site
The Kratt Brothers Official Site

Sources

2000s American documentary television series
2003 American television series debuts
2007 American television series endings
2000s Canadian documentary television series
2003 Canadian television series debuts
2007 Canadian television series endings
National Geographic (American TV channel) original programming
CBC Television original programming
Television series by DHX Media
American television spin-offs
American non-fiction television series
Canadian television spin-offs
Nature educational television series
Television series about brothers
Television series created by Chris Kratt
Television series created by Martin Kratt